In operations research and engineering, a criticality matrix is a representation (often graphical) of failure modes along with their probabilities and severities.

Example

For example, an aircraft might have the following matrix:

Industrial engineering